The third USS Relief (YP-2) was a lookout station tender that served in the United States Navy from 1917 to 1921.

Relief was a wooden private motorboat built during 1910 at Yarmouth, Maine. Ensign Walter G. Richardson purchased her for the U.S. Navy for World War I service on 13 June 1917 with funds furnished by the Bar Harbor War Relief Committee of Bar Harbor, Maine, for use as a tender to the lookout station at Crumple Island, Maine. In 1920 she was designated YP-2.

Relief was sold on 4 June 1921 to Gus Potter of Yonkers, New York, remaining on mercantile registers until 1946 when she was transferred to exempt status as a yacht.

References

External links
 Department of the Navy: Naval Historical Center: Online Library of Selected Images: Civilian Ships: Relief (American Motor Boat, 1910). Served as USS Relief and YP-2 in 1917-1921.

Tenders of the United States Navy
Ships built in Maine
1910 ships